The Deutschland-Cup was a one-off football competition played in November 1990, to celebrate German reunification. The match was played one week after the dissolution of the East German Football Association and its merger with the German Football Association, and featured the reigning champions of East and West Germany, Dynamo Dresden and Bayern Munich respectively. The match, which was played at the Rudolf-Harbig-Stadion in Dresden, was won 1–0 by Dynamo.

Match

Details

Similar matches

A similar match was held on 22 August 1990 to celebrate German reunification. The match featured the reigning cup winners of East and West Germany, Dynamo Dresden and 1. FC Kaiserslautern, respectively. The match, which was played at the Rudolf-Harbig-Stadion in Dresden, was won 2–4 on penalties by Kaiserslautern, following a 1–1 draw after extra time.

See also
1989–90 Bundesliga
1989–90 DDR-Oberliga
1991 DFB-Supercup
East Germany–West Germany football rivalry

References

Dynamo Dresden matches
FC Bayern Munich matches
Association football matches in Germany
German reunification
1990–91 in German football
East Germany–West Germany relations
DFL-Supercup
November 1990 sports events in Europe